The 2022–23 Serie C is the ninth season of the unified Serie C division, the third tier of the Italian football league system.

Changes
The league will be composed by 60 teams, geographically divided into three different groups. The group composition will be decided and formalized by the Serie C league committee between July and August.

The following teams have changed division since the 2021–22 season:

To Serie C
Relegated from Serie B
 Vicenza 
 Alessandria
 Crotone
 Pordenone

Promoted from Serie D
 Novara (Group A winners)
 Sangiuliano City Nova (Group B winners)
 Arzignano (Group C winners)
 Rimini (Group D winners)
 San Donato Tavarnelle (Group E winners)
 Recanatese (Group F winners)
 Giugliano (Group G winners)
 Audace Cerignola (Group H winners)
 Gelbison (Group I winners)
 Torres (Group G play-off winners, admitted)

From Serie C
Promoted to Serie B
 Südtirol
 Modena
 Bari
 Palermo

Relegated to Serie D
 Seregno
 Giana Erminio
 Legnago
 Teramo (excluded)
 Pistoiese
 Grosseto
 Campobasso (excluded)
 Paganese
 Vibonese
 Catania (excluded)

Vacancies 
On 1 July 2022, the Co.Vi.So.C. rejected the league applications of Teramo and Campobasso. Both exclusions were confirmed on appeal on 8 July 2022, with both teams announcing their intention to request one further appeal in front of the Italian National Olympic Committee sports magistrature, which was rejected.

The appeal at TAR of Lazio was rejected on 3 August 2022, leading the football league to confirm the repechages of Fermana and Torres. However, later on 4 August 2022, the Council of State suspended the exclusion of Campobasso, with a final appeal sentence scheduled on 25 August; as a direct consequence, the Lega Pro football league postponed indefinitely the announcement of the fixture list. On 26 August 2022, the Council of State finally confirmed the exclusion of both Campobasso and Teramo.

Name changes
On 26 August 2022, Juventus Under-23 (Juventus's reserve team) changed its name to Juventus Next Gen.

Group A (North)

Stadia and locations 
9 teams from Lombardy, 4 team from Veneto, 3 teams from  Piedmont, 2 teams from Friuli Venezia Giulia, 1 team from Emilia-Romagna and 1 team from Trentino-South Tyrol.

Table

Group B (Centre)

Stadia and locations 
6 teams from Tuscany, 5  teams from Emilia-Romagna, 4 teams from Marche, 2 team from Sardinia. 1 team from Liguria, 1 team from Piedmont and 1 team from Umbria.

Table

Group C (South)

Stadia and locations 
6 teams from Apulia, 5 teams from Campania, 3 teams from Lazio, 2 teams from Basilicata, 2 teams from Calabria, 1 team from Abruzzo and 1 team from Sicily.

Table

Top goalscorers

References

External links
 Official website

Serie C seasons
3
Italy
Italy